Winchelsea was a parliamentary constituency in Sussex, which elected two Members of Parliament (MPs) to the House of Commons from 1366 until 1832, when it was abolished by the Great Reform Act.

History

Boundaries
Winchelsea was a Cinque Port, rather than a parliamentary borough, but the difference was purely a nominal one, and it was considered an egregious example of a rotten borough. The constituency consisted of the town and parish of Winchelsea, once a market town and port but by the 19th century much reduced in importance, a mile-and-a-half inland with its harbour destroyed. In 1831, the population of the constituency was estimated at 772, and the town contained 148 houses.

History of corruption
The right to vote was exercised by the freemen of the town, of whom by 1831 there were just 11, even though in theory the custom was that every son of a freeman and every freeholder in the town was entitled to his freedom. With so few voters, bribery was the rule rather than the exception, though occasionally it became so blatant that the authorities were able to take steps against it. In 1700 an election at Winchelsea was declared void, an agent of one of the candidates arrested for bribery by order of the House of Commons, and the representation of the borough suspended until the end of the session. At another controversial election in 1712, the Commons committee which investigated was told that voters had been bribed with £30 each to vote for the sitting MPs, and their female connections received additional payments of half a guinea (10s. 6d.) each.

Nor was the expense confined to bribing the voters. Oldfield records that in 1811, with only 11 voters to poll, the Mayor demanded – and received – a fee of £200 for his services as returning officer. However, he presumably carried out his duties more satisfactorily than his predecessor in 1624, who was "brought to the bar [of the House of Commons], and on his knees severely reprimanded, and sentenced to be committed to prison" for threatening some of the voters and corruptly excluding some others from casting their votes.

Almost as troublesome was the election of 1667, when it was alleged that the Mayor had not taken the sacrament – being a communicating member of the Church of England was then a requirement for holding civic office – and that therefore the election he had conducted was void. The committee agreed, and proposed a motion that the MP who had been returned was not duly elected, but the whole House voted it down, and the election was allowed to stand. In 1702, again, the Mayor was taken into custody for corrupt practices, and expelled from all his offices in the Customs by resolution of the Commons, against the opposition of government ministers, in whose interests the corruption had been executed.

Patronage
Winchelsea affords an unusual instance of a sitting MP wresting control of a pocket borough from its "patrons", so as to be able to be sure of securing re-election on his own account. In the first half of the 18th century, Winchelsea was a "treasury borough", that is one where the influence of the government was so strong that ministers were able to consider themselves the patrons and were sure of the power to choose both MPs. In 1754, however, one of the government candidates was an Irishman named Arnold Nesbitt. Once elected, Nesbitt began to buy houses in Winchelsea so as to secure influence over the freemen, and was so far successful that by the time of the next election it was accepted that he had the absolute command of one of the seats; indeed, when he stood well with the Treasury he was also allowed to nominate for the other. For the rest of his life he successfully defended his control of Winchelsea from the free-spending of the Treasury's agents; on one occasion, it appears that the town clerk was directing the government campaign and finding himself needing more funds for the purpose than had been provided pawned the town's charters and civic regalia.

However, in 1779 Nesbitt died £100,000 in debt, and the Court of Chancery made a decree to auction his property for the relief of his creditors, but his nephew anticipating this managed to sell the Nesbitt interest in the borough back to the government's supporters (in the person of The Earl of Darlington) for the very considerable sum of £15,000, shortly before the court's decree came into force. Ministers were free once more to consider both seats at the ministry's disposal. However, Oldfield notes that Nesbitt's power in the borough was one of influence rather than of any direct property in the votes (as might have been the case in a burgage borough where the right to vote could literally be bought and sold) – and that whatever the bargain between Nesbitt's nephew and Darlington, the voters themselves were not a party to it and had still to be persuaded to co-operate. Therefore, what was sold, in effect, was the unhindered right to bribe the voters without interference, the customary price by this time being apparently £100 per vote.

Abolition
Winchelsea was abolished as a separate constituency by the Reform Act, but the nearby Cinque Port of Rye retained one of its two MPs, and Rye's parliamentary boundaries were extended to include Winchelsea from 1832.

Members of Parliament

1366–1640

MPs 1640–1832

Notes

References 
Robert Beatson, A Chronological Register of Both Houses of Parliament (London: Longman, Hurst, Res & Orme, 1807) A Chronological Register of Both Houses of the British Parliament, from the Union in 1708, to the Third Parliament of the United Kingdom of Great Britain and Ireland, in 1807
 D Brunton & D H Pennington, Members of the Long Parliament (London: George Allen & Unwin, 1954)
Cobbett's Parliamentary history of England, from the Norman Conquest in 1066 to the year 1803 (London: Thomas Hansard, 1808) titles A-Z
T. H. B. Oldfield, The Representative History of Great Britain and Ireland (London: Baldwin, Cradock & Joy, 1816)
 J Holladay Philbin, Parliamentary Representation 1832 – England and Wales (New Haven: Yale University Press, 1965)
 Edward Porritt and Annie G Porritt, The Unreformed House of Commons (Cambridge University Press, 1903)
 Henry Stooks Smith, "The Parliaments of England from 1715 to 1847" (2nd edition, edited by FWS Craig – Chichester: Parliamentary Reference Publications, 1973)
 

Parliamentary constituencies in South East England (historic)
Constituencies of the Parliament of the United Kingdom established in 1366
Constituencies of the Parliament of the United Kingdom disestablished in 1832
Rotten boroughs
Cinque ports parliament constituencies
Winchelsea